The 2013 Sibiu Open was a professional tennis tournament played on clay courts. It was the second edition of the tournament which was part of the 2013 ATP Challenger Tour. It takes place in Sibiu, Romania between 23 and 29 September 2013.

Singles main draw entrants

Seeds

 1 Rankings are as of September 16, 2013.

Other entrants
The following players received wildcards into the singles main draw:
  Alexandru-Daniel Carpen
  Rareș Ispas
  Florin Mergea
  Filippo Volandri

The following players received entry from the qualifying draw:
  Toni Androić
  Mate Delić
  Răzvan Sabău
  Richard Becker

The following players received entry as a lucky loser the singles main draw:
  Tihomir Grozdanov

Champions

Singles

 Jaroslav Pospíšil def.  Marco Cecchinato 4–6, 6–4, 6–1

Doubles

 Rameez Junaid /  Philipp Oswald def.  Jamie Delgado /  Jordan Kerr 6–4, 6–4

External links
Official Website
ITF Search
ATP official site

Sibiu Open
Sibiu Open
2013 in Romanian tennis
September 2013 sports events in Romania